The 2012–13 West of Scotland Super League Premier Division was the eleventh Super League Premier Division competition since the formation of the Scottish Junior Football Association, West Region in 2002. The season began on 18 August 2012. The winners of this competition gain direct entry to round one of the 
2013–14 Scottish Cup. The two last placed sides were relegated to the Super League First Division. The third-bottom placed side entered the West Region league play-off, a two-legged tie against the third placed side in the Super League First Division, to decide the final promotion/relegation spot.

Auchinleck Talbot won the championship on 1 May 2013.

Member clubs for the 2012–13 season
Irvine Meadow were the reigning champions.

Glenafton Athletic and Shotts Bon Accord were promoted from the Super League First Division, replacing Largs Thistle and Kilbirnie Ladeside.

Pollok had retained their place in the league after defeating Renfrew in the West Region League play-off.

Managerial changes

League table

Results

West Region League play-off
Largs Thistle, who finished third in the Super League First Division, defeated Ashfield 4 – 3 on penalty kicks after a 7 – 7 draw on aggregate in the West Region League play-off. Largs will replace Ashfield in the 2013–14 West of Scotland Super League Premier Division.

References

6
SJFA West Region Premiership seasons